Baktriana Reef is the 360 m long in east-west direction and 40 m wide flat and rocky low-tide elevation off the west coast of Snow Island in the South Shetland Islands, Antarctica. Its surface area is 0.33 ha. The vicinity was visited by early 19th century sealers.

The feature is so named because of its shape supposedly resembling the two humps of a Bactrian camel (‘baktriana’ in Bulgarian).

Location
British mapping in 1968.

See also
 List of Antarctic and subantarctic islands

Maps
 South Shetland Islands. Scale 1:200000 topographic map. DOS 610 Sheet W 62 60. Tolworth, UK, 1968
 L. Ivanov. Antarctica: Livingston Island and Greenwich, Robert, Snow and Smith Islands. Scale 1:120000 topographic map. Troyan: Manfred Wörner Foundation, 2010.  (First edition 2009. )
 Antarctic Digital Database (ADD). Scale 1:250000 topographic map of Antarctica. Scientific Committee on Antarctic Research (SCAR). Since 1993, regularly upgraded and updated

Notes

References
 Bulgarian Antarctic Gazetteer. Antarctic Place-names Commission. (details in Bulgarian, basic data in English)

External links
 Baktriana Reef. Adjusted Copernix satellite image

Snow Island (South Shetland Islands)
Reefs of Antarctica
Bulgaria and the Antarctic